FK Vardarski is a football club from Bogdanci, Republic of Macedonia. They are currently competing in the Macedonian Third League (East Division).

History
The club was founded in 1969. Their greatest success are the playing in the Macedonian First Football League in the inaugural season (1992–93).

Cvetan Churlinov started his career with the team.

References

External links
Club info at MacedonianFootball 
Football Federation of Macedonia 

Vardarski
FK
Association football clubs established in 1969
1969 establishments in the Socialist Republic of Macedonia